Gladiator Academy is a children's animated television series created by Claudio Biern Boyd, who also created The World of David the Gnome. The series was targeted to children aged 6 to 10 and premiered on Telecinco in 2002. It was a co-production between Telecinco and Boyd's company BRB Internacional.

The show was made available on Mediaset Spain's MiteleKids website in 2013. In North America, Gladiator Academy was added to the Toon Goggles on-demand service for children. Internationally, the series was picked up by MVS Comunicaciones in Latin America, Mediatrade in Italy, NOGA in Israel, and Turkish Media Corporation in Turkey.

Plot
A group of four young gladiators live on the Mediterranean island of Cornucopia during the height of the Roman Empire. They work in the island's Colosseum and protect the island from silly villains.

Characters
 Fracas: The gladiator group's athletic and handsome leader. He is vain and obsessed with his appearance.
 Arena: A strong and agile female gladiator with red hair. She is intelligent but rather reckless.
 Rumpus: A very kind and large gladiator with the strength to lift rocks with just one hand. He is not very quick-witted.
 Hocus: The group's shortest member with a knack for coming up with good ideas. He is very logical.
 Sinus: An eight-year-old boy who governs Cornucopia. He is very responsible for his age.

Episodes
"The Art of Deception"
"Sporadicus"
"The Blooms of Doom"
"The Littlest Gladiator"
"Babies in Gladiatorland"
"The Unhappy Birthday Present"
"The Revenge of the Gladiator Girls"
"Cornucopia Beach Resort"
"Hydra Go Seek"
"The Host"
"Honeymoon on Sight"
"The Unicorn Conspiracy"
"No Roman Is an Island"
"The End of the Game"
"The Dregs from Rome"
"An Eye for an Eye"
"Heavenly Spoiled Brats"
"Sea No Evil, Head No Evil"
"The Cyclops Who Would Be Queen"
"The Longest Battle"
"Brute Is Beautiful"
"Experience Teaches (Live and Learn)"
"The Best Lion of the Empire"
"Magnusson's Little Helpers"
"Ave Sinus Caesar"
"Something Wacky This Way Comes"
Gladiator Academy: The TV Movie

References

External links
 Gladiator Academy on BRB.es
 

2000s animated television series
2000s children's television series
2000s Spanish television series
2002 Spanish television series debuts
Spanish children's animated action television series
Spanish children's animated adventure television series
Spanish children's animated comedy television series
Spanish children's animated fantasy television series